Carmine "Mino" Pecorelli (14 September 1928 – 20 March 1979) was an Italian journalist, shot dead in Rome a year after former prime minister Aldo Moro's 1978 kidnapping and subsequent killing. He was described as a "maverick journalist with excellent secret service contacts." According to Pecorelli, Aldo Moro's kidnapping had been organized by a "lucid superpower" and was inspired by the "logic of Yalta". Pecorelli's name was on Licio Gelli's list of Propaganda Due masonic members, discovered in 1980 by the Italian police.

Pecorelli was killed in Rome's Prati district with four gunshots, on 20 March 1979. Former prime minister Giulio Andreotti was tried on charges of complicity in the murder of Pecorelli, but was acquitted along with his co-defendants that included Gaetano Badalamenti and Massimo Carminati, in 1999. Local prosecutors successfully appealed the acquittal and there was a retrial, which in 2002 convicted Andreotti and sentenced him to 24 years imprisonment. The Italian supreme court definitively acquitted Andreotti of the murder in 2003.

Life 

Pecorelli was born in Sessano del Molise, a small municipality in the province of Isernia. During the German occupation of Italy in World War II he briefly enrolled in Junio Valerio Borghese's private fascist militia Decima Flottiglia MAS, forging contacts which would later come in handy during his career as journalist. Later, in 1944, he joined the Polish II Corps at Oratino, near Campobasso, where he was the youngest native volunteer (barely 16 years old) in the 111th Bridge Security Company. With the Company he fought against the Germans on several occasions, most notably at the Battle of Monte Cassino in May of that year.

After graduating in law, Pecorelli began practising as a bankruptcy lawyer. Described by La Repubblica as an 'anti-communist but not a fascist', he soon gravitated towards the ruling Christian Democrats (Democrazia Cristiana; DC), becoming associated in particular with the party's administrative secretary, Egidio Carenini. In the early 1960s Pecorelli became Minister Fiorentino Sullo's head of press service, thereby starting his career as a journalist. Initially writing for Nuovo Mondo d'Oggi, a political journal with such a reputation for muckraking that it was closed down by the Ministry of the Interior, in 1968 Pecorelli founded his own press agency, Osservatore Politico (OP). OP later became a weekly magazine specializing in political scandals, and by the late 1970s it had published many first-hand stories that Pecorelli was able to obtain through his numerous contacts in the government, including those in the secret services. Pecorelli publicly acknowledged that his best pieces were often those which had not been published due to agreements with the subjects involved, most of whom preferred to pay hefty sums of money to ensure his silence. 

Pecorelli was able to describe with ease complex situations, often protecting facts and characters behind pseudonyms. For example, he usually referred to General Carlo Alberto Dalla Chiesa in the pages of OP as 'General Amen,' explaining that it was he who, in the weeks following Aldo Moro's kidnapping by the Red Brigades (Brigate Rosse; BR) in March 1978, had informed Interior Minister Francesco Cossiga of the location of the hideout where Moro was being detained. Pecorelli wrote that Dalla Chiesa was in danger and would be assassinated. Dalla Chiesa was murdered four years later, in September 1982.

Pecorelli published many confidential documents relating to the Moro Affair throughout 1978 and early 1979, such as the letters Moro wrote to his family while in captivity (known as his 'testimonial'). In a cryptic article published in May 1978, Pecorelli drew a connection between Operation Gladio (NATO's 'stay-behind' anti-communist organization, whose existence was publicly acknowledged by Prime Minister Giulio Andreotti in October 1990) and Moro's death. It has since been established that, while being interrogated by the BR, Moro made several references to "NATO's anti-guerrilla activities".

Death 

Mino Pecorelli was killed in Rome's Prati district with four gunshots, on 20 March 1979. The bullets used to kill him were of the Gevelot brand, a peculiarly rare type of bullet not easily found in gun markets, either legal or clandestine. The same type of bullet was later found in the Banda della Maglianas weapon stock, concealed in the Health Ministry's basement. Investigations targeted Massimo Carminati, member of the far-right organization Nuclei Armati Rivoluzionari (NAR) and of the Banda della Magliana, the head of Propaganda Due, Licio Gelli, Antonio Viezzer, Cristiano Fioravanti and Valerio Fioravanti.

Contemporaneously with his trial for Mafia association, Giulio Andreotti was tried in Perugia with Sicilian Mafia boss Gaetano Badalamenti, Massimo Carminati, and others on charges of complicity in the murder of journalist Mino Pecorelli. The case was circumstantial and based on the word of Mafia turncoat Tommaso Buscetta, who had not originally mentioned the allegation about Andreotti when interviewed by Giovanni Falcone and had recanted it by the time of the trial.

On 6 April 1993, Mafia turncoat Tommaso Buscetta told Palermo prosecutors that he had learnt from his boss Gaetano Badalamenti that Pecorelli's murder had been carried out in the interest of Andreotti. The Salvo cousins, two powerful Sicilian politicians with deep ties to local Mafia families, were also involved in the murder. Buscetta testified that Gaetano Badalamenti told him that the murder had been commissioned by the Salvo cousins as a favor to Andreotti. Andreotti was allegedly afraid that Pecorelli was about to publish information that could have destroyed his political career. Among the information was the complete memorial of Aldo Moro, which would be published only in 1990 and which Pecorelli had shown to General Carlo Alberto Dalla Chiesa before his death. 

Andreotti was acquitted along with his co-defendants in 1999. Local prosecutors successfully appealed the acquittal and there was a retrial, which in 2002 convicted Andreotti and sentenced him to 24 years imprisonment. Italians of all political allegiances denounced the conviction. Many failed to understand how the court could convict Andreotti of orchestrating the killing, yet acquit his co-accused, who supposedly had carried out his orders by setting up and committing the murder. The Italian supreme court definitively acquitted Andreotti of the murder in 2003.

References

See also 
 List of journalists killed in Europe
 List of victims of the Sicilian Mafia
Aldo Moro
Strategy of tension
Propaganda Due
Operation Gladio

1928 births
1979 deaths
Assassinated Italian journalists
Deaths by firearm in Italy
Deaths related to the Years of Lead (Italy)
History of the Sicilian Mafia
Italian magazine editors
People from the Province of Isernia
People murdered by the Sicilian Mafia
20th-century Italian journalists
Italian male journalists
20th-century Italian male writers
1979 murders in Italy